Cinco Bayou is a town in Okaloosa County, Florida, United States. The population was 383 at the 2010 census. It is part of the Fort Walton Beach–Crestview–Destin Metropolitan Statistical Area.

Geography

Cinco Bayou is located at  (30.421748, –86.609120).

The town is completely surrounded by the city of Fort Walton Beach.

Demographics

As of the census of 2000, there were 377 people, 212 households, and 82 families residing in the town. The racial makeup of the town was 81.17% White, 12.73% African American, 0.80% Native American, 3.98% Asian, 0.27% from other races, and 1.06% from two or more races. Hispanic or Latino of any race were 3.71% of the population.

There were 212 households, out of which 15.1% had children under the age of 18 living with them, 27.8% were married couples living together, 7.1% had a female householder with no husband present, and 61.3% were non-families. 46.2% of all households were made up of individuals, and 8.5% had someone living alone who was 65 years of age or older.  The average household size was 1.77 and the average family size was 2.43.

In the town, the population was spread out, with 12.5% under the age of 18, 7.2% from 18 to 24, 43.0% from 25 to 44, 25.5% from 45 to 64, and 11.9% who were 65 years of age or older.  The median age was 40 years. For every 100 females, there were 96.4 males.  For every 100 females age 18 and over, there were 93.0 males.

The median income for a household in the town was $28,036, and the median income for a family was $28,750. Males had a median income of $33,750 versus $21,250 for females. The per capita income for the town was $22,425.  About 9.9% of families and 15.5% of the population were below the poverty line, including 25.4% of those under age 18 and 4.4% of those age 65 or over.

History
Cinco Bayou was incorporated on July 3, 1950, at a meeting held at the Cinco Bayou garage, attended by about 60 people. Gordon Gibson was elected the first mayor. At this time there were about 250 residents in the area between the Fort Walton city limits and the Cinco Bayou, an east-west oriented finger of water on the west end of the Choctawhatchee Bay.

References

External links
 Town of Cinco Bayou official site
 Northwest Florida Daily News

Towns in Okaloosa County, Florida
Populated places established in 1950
Towns in Florida
1950 establishments in Florida